Itaka is an administrative ward in Mbozi District, Songwe Region, Tanzania.

Population
According to the 2002 census, the ward has a total population of 33,310.

Religion
The Catholic Church of St. Thomas More is twinned with St. Augustine's Church in Leeds, UK.

References

Wards of Songwe Region